Father Lazarus El Anthony is an Australian Coptic Orthodox Christian monk and hermit in Egypt. He has appeared in several documentaries and the BBC series Extreme Pilgrim. 

Fr. Lazarus has been the primary subject of two documentary films, The Last Anchorite, which took Best Documentary Transmitter Award winner at the Crystal Palace International Film Festival 2010, and Desert Foreigners, released in 2018. In addition, there are numerous short videos arranged in several series of videos on the Coptic Youth Channel on YouTube.

Biography
Lazarus El Anthony was born into a Protestant Christian family in Tasmania, Australia, where he attended Methodist and Roman Catholic church services as a child. He became an atheist when he was a teenager. He taught philosophy at a university in Tasmania. After his mother died he had become a monk at the St. Sava Serbian Orthodox Monastery in Australia and at Mount Athos in Greece. After he met Pope Shenouda IIII, Lazarus El Anthony moved to Egypt to become a hermit on Mount Colzim near the Monastery of Saint Anthony in Red Sea Governorate, eastern Egypt. There, he currently lives an ascetic life in the footsteps of Saint Anthony the Great and the other Desert Fathers.

Media
Lazarus El Anthony has been extensively interviewed on the Coptic Youth Channel. He has also been featured in a full-length episode of the BBC's Extreme Pilgrim, and in The Last Anchorite, a documentary film by filmmaker Remigiusz Sowa. Another documentary film about Lazarus El Anthony is Desert Foreigners.

See also
Desert Fathers

References

External links

Living people
Australian hermits
Australian expatriates in Egypt
Coptic Orthodox Christians
Oriental Orthodox monks
Year of birth missing (living people)
People associated with Mount Athos
People from Tasmania